28th Guards Order of the Red Banner Missile Division is a missile division under command of the 27th Guards Missile Army of the Strategic Rocket Forces of Russia headquartered at Kozelsk in Kaluga Oblast.

History
28th Guards Red Banner Missile Division was formed on May 3, 1961, on the base of 198th Engineer Missile Brigade. On August 4, the Division received its colors.

The first training launch (R-2 missile) was performed on August 18.

On May 30, 1964, two regiments armed with R-9 Desna ICBM were formed under command of the 28th Division. Between 1967 and 1969 eleven UR-100 regiments were formed.

On President's order one of the regiments received title Kaluga. On September 12, 2007, one of the regiments (07390) was disbanded.

There were plans to disband the entire division by 2010, but on November 5, 2008 President Dmitry Medvedev during his speech at the joint session of Russia's Parliament announced that the 28th Division will resume its mission.

In 2013, work began on the rearmament of 10 silos of the 28th Missile Division with the silo complex version of the RS-24 "Yars" which completed in 2018.

Commanders
 1961–1967: Major General Mikhail S. Burmak
 1967–1975: Major General Vasiliy M. Barabanshikov
 1975–1977: Major General Vladimir A. Generalov
 1977–1980: Major General Vladimir M. Timofeyev
 1980–1986: Major General Vladimir I. Petrov
 1986–1992: Major General Dmitry N. Bolshakov
 1992–1995: Major General Boris A. Polyakov
 1995–1998: Major General Vasiliy G. Karavaytsev
 1998–2001: Major General Sergey V. Karakayev
 2001–2004: Major General Victor A. Fyodorov
 2004–2009: Major General Oleg G. Antsiferov
 2009–2013: Colonel Edward E. Stefantsov
 Since February 27, 2013: Colonel Valeriy V. Kasyanov

Equipment
In 1961-1964 the 28th Division received 15 R-9 Desna ICBM launchers, including 6 silos.

In 1967 the first (out of 11) UR-100 regiment was formed.

By 1978 6 out of 11 UR-100 regiments received modified UR-100N (US DOD: SS-19 Stiletto) missiles. As of 2010 UR-100N remains the only ICBM in service with the division.

References

Rocket divisions of the Soviet Union
Rocket divisions of Russia
Military units and formations established in 1961